Lukačevci is a village in the Municipality of Moravske Toplice in the Prekmurje region of Slovenia.

The local chapel, built on the outskirts of the village, is dedicated to Saints Peter and Paul and belongs to the Parish of Murska Sobota.

References

External links

Lukačevci on Geopedia

Populated places in the Municipality of Moravske Toplice